Mohamed Zakaria Boulahia (born 1 June 1997), sometimes known as just Zaka, is an Algerian footballer who plays as an winger for MC El Bayadh.

Career

As a youth player, Boulahia joined the youth academy of Atlético Madrid, one of Spain's most successful clubs from the youth academy of Huracán Valencia in the Spanish third division.

He started his career with the reserves of Atlético Madrid, helping them achieve promotion from the Spanish fourth division to the third division.

In 2018, Zaka signed for Real Murcia in the Spanish third division.

Before the second half of 2018/19, he signed for Spanish fourth division side Atlético Albacete.

In 2020, he signed for JS Kabylie in Algeria.

In 2021, he signed for Emirates Club in UAE.
In 2023, he joined MC El Bayadh.

References

External links
 
 

Living people
1997 births
People from Aïn Témouchent
Algerian footballers
Algerian expatriate footballers
Association football forwards
Atlético Madrid B players
Real Murcia players
Emirates Club players
JS Kabylie players
Segunda División B players
Tercera División players
UAE Pro League players
Algerian Ligue Professionnelle 1 players
Algerian expatriate sportspeople in Spain
Algerian expatriate sportspeople in the United Arab Emirates
Expatriate footballers in Spain
Expatriate footballers in the United Arab Emirates
21st-century Algerian people
Spanish people of Algerian descent